Sunday Lake is a census-designated place (CDP) in Snohomish County, Washington, United States. The population was 640 at the 2010 census.

Geography
Sunday Lake is located at  (48.230172, -122.267664).

According to the United States Census Bureau, the CDP has a total area of 1.79 square miles (4.65 km), of which, 1.73 square miles (4.48 km) is land and 0.06 square miles (0.17 km; 3.57%) is water.

References 

Census-designated places in Washington (state)
Census-designated places in Snohomish County, Washington